Sir Theodore Crawford (23 December 1911 – 27 July 1993) was a British pathologist, Professor of Pathology in the University of London, 1948–1977.

References 
 CRAWFORD, Prof. Sir Theodore (Sir Theo)’, Who Was Who, A & C Black, 1920–2008; online edn, Oxford University Press, Dec 2007 accessed 22 Feb 2012
 https://www.independent.co.uk/news/people/obituary-professor-sir-theo-crawford-1458930.html

1911 births
1993 deaths
British pathologists
Knights Bachelor
20th-century British medical doctors